Salvatore Cherchi (born 15 November 1950) is an Italian politician who served as Deputy (1983–1992, 1996–2001), Senator (1992–1996), Mayor of Carbonia  (2001–2010) and President of the Province of Carbonia-Iglesias (2010–2013).

References

External links

1958 births
Living people
Mayors of Carbonia
Democrats of the Left politicians
Democratic Party (Italy) politicians
Deputies of Legislature IX of Italy
Deputies of Legislature X of Italy
Deputies of Legislature XIII of Italy
Senators of Legislature XI of Italy
Senators of Legislature XII of Italy